ATO may refer to:

Technology
Abort to Orbit, an intact abort procedure for Space Shuttle launches
Arsenic trioxide a potent chemotherapeutic agent for acute promyelocytic leukemia
ATO fuse
Automatic train operation
Assisted take off

Military 
Air Tasking Order, (United States Air Force)
Air Training Officer, a former position at the United States Air Force Academy
Ammunition Technical Officer, a designation in the British Armed Force
Anti-Terrorist Operation in Ukraine, the Ukrainian government's operation in the War in Donbas, 2014-current time, since 2018 it has been called Joint Forces Operation.
 ATO zone, the official name for territory where the War in Donbas takes place

Organizations
Alpha Tau Omega, an American student fraternity
Alpha Tau Omega (Philippines), a Filipino student fraternity
Alternative Trading Organization, an NGO focusing on Fair Trade exports 
Air Traffic Organization, a division of the Federal Aviation Administration
Air Transportation Office (Philippines), agency of the Philippine government
Arab Towns Organization, a network to promote cooperation between and development of Arab cities
ATO Records, a record label
Australian Taxation Office, the Australian government tax agency

Other
Ato, another name for dap-ay, traditional meeting places of various ethnic groups in the northern Philippines
Account takeover, a form of payments and online fraud
Assemble To Order, see build to order
Asset turnover
ATO, the Amtrak station code for Atco (NJT station), New Jersey, U.S.A.
Atmos Energy Corporation's ticker symbol on the New York Stock Exchange
Authority to Operate, part of a Risk Management Framework
Amateur Try-Out, a type of ice hockey contract

Places
Ato, Yamaguchi – a Japanese town
Ato Station

See also 
Osman Ali Atto also written Osman Ali Ato, a Somali warlord
One of three 2002 Football World Cup mascots